The 2022 Alabama House of Representatives elections were held on November 8, 2022. The Republican and Democratic primaries were held on May 24, 2022, and any races in which no candidate exceeded one-half plus one of the total vote advanced to a runoff on June 21, 2022. This is the first election cycle since 2002 in which the Libertarian Party of Alabama was on the ballot, as they exceeded the threshold for petition signatures needed to gain ballot access in Alabama. Libertarian candidates were nominated by party convention. All 105 of Alabama's state representatives were up for reelection. In Alabama, members of both the House of Representatives and the Senate serve four year terms, running in years corresponding with presidential midterm elections.

Background

Retirements

Republicans
District 2: Lynn Greer retired.
District 3: Andrew Sorrell retired to run for auditor of Alabama.
District 10: Mike Ball retired.
District 13: Connie Rowe retired.
District 15: Allen Farley retired.
District 20: Howard Sanderford retired.
District 25: Mac McCutcheon retired.
District 26: Kerry Rich retired.
District 31: Mike Holmes retired.
District 40: K. L. Brown retired.
District 61: Rodney Sullivan retired
District 62: Rich Wingo retired.
District 64: Harry Shiver retired.
District 89: Wes Allen retired to run for Alabama Secretary of State.
District 92: Mike Jones retired to run for state senator from District 31.
District 95: Steve McMillan retired.
District 100: Victor Gaston retired.

Democrats
District 56: Louise Alexander retired to run for state senator from District 19.
District 57: Merika Coleman retired to run for state senator from District 19.

Incumbents defeated

In primary elections

Republicans
District 7: Proncey Robertson lost renomination to Ernie Yarbrough.
District 23: Tommy Hanes lost renomination to Mike Kirkland.
District 28: Gil Isbell lost renomination to Mack Butler.
District 45: Dickie Drake lost renomination to Susan DuBose.
District 88: Will Dismukes lost renomination to Jerry Starnes.
District 94: Joe Faust lost renomination to Jennifer Fidler.

Democrats 
District 55: Rod Scott lost renomination to Fred "Coach" Plump.
District 72: Ralph Anthony Howard lost renomination to Curtis Travis.

Predictions

Results

† - Incumbent not seeking re-election

Closest races 
Seats where the margin of victory was under 10%:
 
  (gain)

Detailed results

Overview

District 1 
Second term incumbent Republican Representative Phillip Pettus has represented the 1st District since November 2014. Pettus was challenged by Florence lawyer Maurice McCaney in the Republican Primary. Pettus won the primary by the skin of his teeth. No Democrats or Libertarians filed to run for the seat, leaving Pettus unopposed in the general election.

Endorsements

District 2 
Third term incumbent Republican Representative Lynn Greer has represented the 2nd District since November 2010. He announced his retirement at the end of the 2022 election cycles.
Former Limestone county commissioner Jason Black, photography studio owner Kimberly Butler, former Limestone County commissioner Ben Harrison and Lauderdale County resident Terrance Irelan all ran in the primary to replace Greer. No candidate gained over half of the vote in the primary, so Harrison and Black advanced to a runoff. In the primary runoff, Harrison defeated Black by a narrow margin. However, Kimberly Butler challenged the results of the primary after obtaining 42 signed affidavits of voters who were assigned to the wrong district after an error. Butler only finished 14 votes out of making the runoff. Her challenge was not heard by the Alabama Republican Party, allowing the results of both primary and the runoff elections to stand. Butler then announced she would run a write-in campaign. No Democrats or Libertarians filed to run for the seat, leaving Harrison unopposed on the general election ballot.

Endorsements

District 3 
1st term incumbent Republican Representative Andrew Sorrell has represented the 3rd District since November 2018. He retired to run for state auditor. Retired United States Air Force officer Fred Joly and mayor of Tuscumbia Kerry "Bubba" Underwood ran in the Republican primary to replace Sorrell while nurse practitioner Susan Warren Bentley faced off against Mercer University alumnus and pastor Wesley Thompson in the Democratic primary. Underwood and Thompson won the Republican and Democratic primaries, respectively.

Endorsements

District 4 
Second term incumbent Republican Representative Parker Moore has represented the 4th District since May 2018. Duncan was challenged in the Republican primary by businesswoman Shelia Banister and State Farm branch owner/operator Patrick Johnson. Johnson managed to force Moore into a runoff, but was just barely defeated. No Democrats or Libertarians filed to run for the seat, leaving Moore unopposed in the general election.

Endorsements

District 5 
Second term incumbent Republican Representative Danny Crawford was unopposed in the 5th district.

Endorsements

District 6 
1st term incumbent Republican Representative Andy Whitt has represented the 6th district since 2018. Greg Turner was nominated by the Libertarian Party and is contesting the district in the general election.

Endorsements

District 7 
First term incumbent Republican Representative Proncey Robertson was defeated in the primary by electrical engineer Ernie Yarbrough. Lawrence County Commissioner Mose Jones, Jr. and Marc Durocher were nominated by the Democratic and Libertarian parties, respectively, to challenge Yarbrough in the general election.

Endorsements

District 8 
Third term incumbent Republican Representative Terri Collins has represented the 8th district 2010. The Libertarian Party nominated tutor Angela Walser to contest the district in the general election.

Endorsements

District 9 
First term incumbent Republican Representative Scott Stadthagen has represented the 9th District since November 2018. The Libertarian Party nominated Gregory Bodine to contest the district in the general election.

Endorsements

District 10 
Fifth term incumbent Republican Representative Mike Ball has represented the 10th District since November 2002. Ball announced his retirement in an op-ed to Yellowhammer News. Retired United States Army surgeon David Cole was nominated by the Republican Party to replace Ball. Accountant Anson Knowles initially filed to run in the primary against Cole, but was thrown off the ballot due to his activism in the Libertarian Party of Madison County. Counselor Marilyn Lands and Elijah Boyd were nominated by the Democratic and Libertarian parties, respectively, to challenge the district in the general election.

Endorsements

District 11 
Third term incumbent Republican Representative Randall Shedd ran unopposed in the 11th district.

Endorsements

District 12 
Second term incumbent Republican Representative Corey Harbison was challenged by former State Representative and perennial candidate James C. Fields in the 12th district.

Endorsements

District 13 
Second term incumbent Republican Representative Connie Rowe resigned her seat after being selected to serve in as a political adviser to Lieutenant Governor of Alabama Will Ainsworth. Retired advertising firm owner Greg Barnes, Walker County Commissioner Keith Davis, Jasper Police Department Lieutenant Matt Dozier, attorney at law Charlie Waits and auto dealership owner Matt Woods all ran in the primary to replace Rowe. Matt Woods cleared the field and avoided a runoff. Mark Davenport was nominated by the Libertarian Party to challenge Woods in the general election.

Endorsements

District 14 
First term incumbent Republican Representative Tim Wadsworth was challenged in the primary by Oakman mayor Cory Franks and mechanical engineer Tom Fredricks. Fredricks managed to pull Wadsworth barely into runoff territory. In the runoff, Wadsworth scored a narrow victory to keep his seat. No Libertarians or Democrats filed to run for the seat, leaving Wadsworth unopposed on the general election ballot.

Endorsements

District 15 
Third term incumbent Republican Representative Allen Farley opted not to seek reelection in 2022. Helena city councilwoman Leigh Hulsey and Bessemer resident Brad Tompkins ran in the primary to replace Farley. In the primary, it was Hulsey who came out on top. The Democratic Party nominated lawyer Richard Rouco to contest the district in the general election.

Endorsements

District 16 
Second term incumbent Republican Representative Kyle South ran unopposed in the 16th district.

Endorsements

District 17 
First term incumbent Republican Representative Tracy Estes ran unopposed in the 17th district.

Endorsements

District 18 
First term incumbent Republican Representative Jamie Kiel ran for reelection in the 18th district. The Libertarian Party nominated Talia Shimp to challenge Kiel in the general election.

Endorsements

District 19 
Eighth term incumbent Democratic Representative Laura Hall ran unopposed in the 19th district.

Endorsements

District 20 
Ninth term incumbent Republican Representative Howard Sanderford opted not to seek reelection in 2022. Progress Bank Chief Risk Officer James Brown, commercial real estate broker James Lomax, lawyer Angela McClure, and defense contractor Frances Taylor all ran in the primary to replace Sanderford. No candidate gained the needed majority of the vote, so Lomax and Taylor advanced to a runoff. Lomax scored a convincing victory in the runoff. No Democrats or Libertarians filed to run for the seat, leaving Lomax unopposed in the general election.

Endorsements

District 21 
Second term incumbent Republican Representative Rex Reynolds ran unopposed in the 21st district.

Endorsements

District 22 
Second term incumbent Republican Representative Ritchie Whorton ran unopposed in the 22nd district.

Endorsements

District 23 
Second term incumbent Republican Representative Tommy Hanes was primaried by Vulcan Materials operations manager Mike Kirkland. No Libertarians or Democrats filed to run for the seat, leaving Kirkland unopposed in the general election.

Endorsements

District 24 
Alabama House of Representatives Majority Leader Nathaniel Ledbetter swept aside token opposition from computer scientist and business owner Don Stout. No Libertarians or Democrats filed to run for the seat, leaving Ledbetter unopposed in the general election.
Democratic primary and general election were canceled because the Republican candidate was the only candidate in the general election.

Endorsements

District 25 
Fourth term incumbent Republican Representative and Speaker of the Alabama House of Representatives Mac McCutcheon announced his retirement at the conclusion of the 2022 legislative session. Retired United States Army helicopter pilot Buck Clemons and pharmacist Phillip Rigsby ran in the primary to replace McCutcheon. Rigsby annihilated Clemons in the primary. Former Miss America Mallory Hagan was nominated by the Democratic Party to contest the district in the general election.

Endorsements

District 26 
Third term incumbent Republican Representative Kerry Rich announced he would not seek reelection in 2022. Financial planner Brock Colvin, nurse Annette Holcomb and businessman Todd Mitchem all ran in the primary to replace Rich. Colvin won the primary outright to represent the Republican Party in the general election. Pastor Ben Alford was nominated by the Democratic Party to contest the district in the general election.

Endorsements

District 27 
First term incumbent Republican Representative Wes Kitchens ran for reelection in the 27th district against Democratic nominee and publisher Herb Neu.

Endorsements

District 28 
First term incumbent Republican Representative Gil Isbell was primaried by former holder of this seat Mack Butler. No Libertarians or Democrats filed to run for the seat, leaving Butler unopposed on the general election ballot. Controversy arose from this election as some voters in this district were accidentally assigned to District 29, and vice versa. This oversight was acknowledged by Etowah County Probate Judge Scott Hassell.

Endorsements

District 29 
Third term incumbent Republican Representative Becky Nordgren resigned her seat in 2021 after being elected Revenue Commissioner of Etowah County. County Commissioner Jamie Grant and preacher Mark Gidley ran in the primary to replace Nordgren. Gidley only won the primary by 74 votes, and an error made by the county in correctly assigning voters between Districts 28 and 29 caused Grant to not immediately concede the election. However, Gidley was still certified as the winner. Clifford Foy Valentin was nominated by the Libertarian Party to contest the district in the general election.

Endorsements

District 30 
First term incumbent Republican Representative Craig Lipscomb ran unopposed in the 30th district.

Endorsements

District 31 
Third term incumbent Republican Representative Mike Holmes announced he would not run for reelection in 2022. Cybersecurity specialist Chadwick Smith and Elmore County Commission Chairman Troy Stubbs both ran in the primary to replace Holmes, with Stubbs gaining about two-thirds of the vote. No Libertarians or Democrats filed to run for the seat, leaving Stubbs unopposed on the general election ballot.

Endorsements

District 32 
Eighth term incumbent Democratic Representative Barbara Boyd was challenged by Republican nominee Evan Jackson in the 32nd district.

Endorsements

District 33 
Ben Robbins ran for his first full term after succeeding the late Ronald Johnson in a special election. The Democratic Party nominated Kappa Alpha Psi fundraising consultant Fred Crum to challenge Robbins in the general election.

Endorsements

District 34 
Third term incumbent Republican Representative David Standridge ran unopposed in the 34th district.

Endorsements

District 35 
Seventh term incumbent Republican Representative Steve Hurst ran unopposed in the 35th district.

Endorsements

District 36 
Sixth term incumbent Republican Representative Randy Wood ran unopposed in the 36th district.

Endorsements

District 37 
Second term incumbent Republican Representative Bob Fincher ran unopposed in the 37th district.

Endorsements

District 38 
First term incumbent Republican Representative Debbie Wood was challenged in the primary by Alabama National Guard officer Micah Messer. Wood narrowly won the primary to keep her seat. Charles A. Temm, Jr. was nominated by the Libertarian Party to contest the district in the general election.

Endorsements

District 39 
First term incumbent Republican Representative Ginny Shaver was challenged by Brent Rhodes in the primary. Shaver demolished Rhodes in the primary. No Libertarians or Democrats filed to run for the seat, leaving Shaver unopposed in the general election.
Democratic primary and general election were canceled because the Republican candidate was the only candidate in the general election.

Endorsements

District 40 
Fourth term incumbent Republican Representative K. L. Brown announced he would not seek reelection in 2022. Teacher Gayla Blanton, Anniston finance director Julie Borrelli, magazine owner Katie Exum, Jacksonville State University professor Bill Lester, general contractor Bill McAdams, United States Navy veteran Chad Robertson and University of Alabama student Jakob Williamson all crowded in the primary to replace Brown. However, none of them exceeded a quarter of the vote, forcing Borrelli and Robertson into a runoff. In the runoff, Robertson squeaked to a razor-thin 19 vote victory. The Democratic Party nominated Jacksonville resident Pam Howard to run against Robertson in the general election.

Endorsements

District 41 
Second term incumbent Republican Representative Corley Ellis ran against Democratic and Libertarian challengers Chris Nelson and Matthew Gregory Morris, Jr. respectively.

Endorsements

District 42 
Ivan Smith ran for his first full term in the House after succeeding Jimmy Martin in a special election. The Libertarian Party nominated Doug Ward to challenge Smith in the general election.

Endorsements

District 43 
Second term incumbent Republican Representative Arnold Mooney was challenged by community organizer Prince Cleveland and Jason Newell Davis Burr for District 43's seat.

Endorsements

District 44 
Second term incumbent Republican Representative Danny Garrett ran for reelection against Libertarian nominee John Wiley Boone.

Endorsements

District 45 
Third term incumbent Republican Representative Dickie Drake was annihilated by banker Susan DuBose. The Libertarian Party nominated Kari Mitchell Whitaker to face DuBose in the general election.

Endorsements

District 46 
Second term incumbent Republican Representative David Faulkner ran unopposed in the 46th district.

Endorsements

District 47 
First term incumbent Republican Representative David Wheeler died in office in March 2022. The Republican Party nominated Hoover city councilman Mike Shaw to succeed Wheeler through a closed nomination process. Alabama National Guard member Christian Coleman and perennial candidate Jim Toomey ran in the Democratic primary to challenge Shaw. Coleman won the primary by a whopping 5 votes to gain his party's nomination.

Endorsements

District 48 
Third term incumbent Republican Representative Jim Carns was challenged by marketing director William Wentowski in the primary. Carns wiped the floor with Wentowski and went on to face Libertarian nominee Bruce Stutts in the general election.

Endorsements

District 49 
Second term incumbent Republican Representative April Weaver resigned her seat in 2020. Incumbent Russell Bedsole demolished talk radio host Michael Hart in the primary and ran unopposed in the general election.

Endorsements

District 50 
Third term incumbent Republican Representative Jim Hill ran unopposed in the 50th district.

Endorsements

District 51 
Fourth term incumbent Republican Representative Allen Treadaway ran unopposed in the 51st district.

Endorsements

District 52 
40-year incumbent John Rogers was challenged in the primary by Western Kentucky University alumna LaTanya Millhouse in the primary. Rogers won the primary in convincing fashion and went unopposed in the general election.

Endorsements

District 53 
Alabama House of Representatives Minority Leader Anthony Daniels ran unopposed in the 53rd district.

Endorsements

District 54 
Firstst term incumbent Democratic Representative Neil Rafferty was challenged by community organizer Brit Blalock and barber shop owner Edward Maddox in the primary, but Rafferty managed to gain enough votes to avoid a runoff. No Republicans or Libertarians filed to run for the seat, leaving Rafferty unopposed in the general election.

Endorsements

District 55 
Fifth term incumbent Democratic Representative Rod Scott represented the 55th District since 2006. Birmingham Police Department Sergeant Travis Hendrix, Fairfield city councilwoman Phyllis Oden-Jones, United States Army veteran Fred "Coach" Plump and perennial candidate Antwon Bernard Womack all challenged Scott in the primary. No candidate gained the needed majority of votes to declare victory, so Plump and Scott advanced to a runoff. In the runoff, Plump defeated incumbent Davis by a razor-thin 33 vote margin to oust incumbent Scott and gain his party's nomination. Following the runoff, Scott requested a recount to be held at the headquarters of the Jefferson County Democratic Party, but the recount only reaffirmed Plump's victory. No Libertarians or Republicans filed to run for the seat, leaving Plump unopposed in the general election.

Endorsements

District 56 
Second term incumbent Democratic Representative Louise Alexander represented the 56th District since November 2014. Alexander would forgo reelection to run for the seat of retiring State Senator Priscilla Dunn. Birmingham Water Works Board member Tereshia Huffman, former Bessemer city councilman Cleo King, current Bessemer city councilman Jesse Matthews and attorney at law Ontario Tillman all ran in the primary to replace Alexander. No candidate eclipsed the needed amount of votes to win outright, so Huffman and Tillman advanced to a runoff. In the runoff, Tillman curb stomped Huffman on the way to gaining his party's nomination for the seat. The Libertarian Party nominated Carson B. Lester to challenge Tillman for the seat in the general election.

Endorsements

District 57 
Fifth term incumbent Democratic Representative Merika Coleman opted to forgo reelection to run for the Senate seat of the retiring Priscilla Dunn.
Pleasant Grove city councilman Kevin Dunn, pastor Patrick Sellers and United States Army veteran Charles Ray Winston III all ran in the primary to replace Coleman. Sellers just barely finished below the threshold for outright victory, so he and Winston advanced to a runoff. Sellers managed to win the runoff by the skin of his teeth, going on to face Republican nominee Delor Baumann and Libertarian nominee Manijeh Nancy Jones in the general election.

Endorsements

District 58 
Second term incumbent Democratic Representative Rolanda Hollis ran unopposed in the 58th district.

Endorsements

District 59 
Sixth term incumbent Democratic Representative Mary Moore ran unopposed in the 59th district.

Endorsements

District 60 
Third term incumbent Democratic Representative Juandalynn Givan was challenged by firefighter Nina Taylor in the primary. Givan easily won the primary and advanced to face Libertarian nominee and Fultondale native J.P. French in the general election.

Endorsements

District 61 
First term incumbent Republican Representative Rodney Sullivan announced he would not run for reelection in the 2022 cycle. Retired Northport police captain Ron Bolton ran for the Republican nomination against media broadcaster Kimberly Madison. In the primary, Bolton scored a convincing victory and advanced to the general election against data analyst Damon Pruet.

Endorsements

District 62 
Second term incumbent Republican Representative Rich Wingo announced he would retire at the end of the quadrennium. Tuscaloosa County CFO
Bill Lamb ran for the seat. He was challenged in the general election by Democratic nominee Brenda Cephus.

Endorsements

District 63 
Third term incumbent Republican Representative Bill Poole resigned his seat to become State Finance Director, and he was succeeded in a special election by Cynthia Almond. Lawyer Samuel Adams contested Almond for the district in the general election.

Endorsements

District 64 
Fourth term incumbent Republican Representative Harry Shiver announced he would not seek reelection. Retired Department of Homeland Security Special Agent Angelo Jacob Fermo and University of Mobile alumna Donna Givens both ran in the primary to succeed Shiver. Givens wound up winning the primary by a slim margin and advanced to the general election against Libertarian nominee Jeff May.
Democratic primary and general election were canceled because the Republican candidate was the only candidate in the general election.

Endorsements

District 65 
First term incumbent Republican Representative Brett Easterbrook was challenged in the primary by Gilbertown city councilwoman Dee Ann Campbell in the Republican primary, but Easterbrook crushed her en route to securing the nomination. The Democratic Party nominated Marcus Caster to challenge Easterbrook in the general election.

Endorsements

District 66 
Fourth term incumbent Republican Representative Alan Baker ran unopposed in the 66th district.

Endorsements

District 67 
Second term incumbent Democratic Representative Prince Chestnut was challenged in the Democratic primary by Larine Irby Pettway. Chestnut gave Pettway an electoral beatdown and ran unopposed in the general election.

Endorsements

District 68 
Eighth term incumbent Democratic Representative Thomas Jackson has represented Alabama House of Representatives 68th District since February 1994. He was challenged in the general election by marketing director Fred Kelley

Endorsements

District 69 
Second term incumbent Democratic Representative Kelvin Lawrence ran against Republican nominee Karla Knight Maddox in the 69th district.

Endorsements

District 70 
Fourth term incumbent Democratic Representative Christopher J. England ran unopposed in the 70th district.

Endorsements

District 71 
Fifth term incumbent Democratic Representative Artis J. McCampbell ran unopposed in the 71st district.

Endorsements

District 72 
Fifth term incumbent Democratic Representative Ralph Anthony Howard was narrowly ousted in the primary by environmental engineer Curtis Travis. No Libertarians or Republicans filed to run for the seat, leaving Travis unopposed in the general election.

Endorsements

District 73 
Kenneth Paschal ran for his first full term unopposed in the 73rd district.

Endorsements

District 74 
Third term incumbent Republican Representative Dimitri Polizos was succeeded by Charlotte Meadows in a special election in 2019. Meadows ran for her first full term against lawyer Phillip Ensler after he defeated businessman Malcolm Calhoun in the Democratic primary.

Endorsements

District 75 
Second term incumbent Republican Representative Reed Ingram ran unopposed in the 75th district.

Endorsements

District 76 
Patrice McClammy succeeded her father, Thad McClammy, in a special election in 2021. She ran for her first full term against Libertarian nominee Scott Manges.

Endorsements

District 77 
1st term incumbent Democratic Representative Tashina Morris ran unopposed in the 77th district.

Endorsements

District 78 
Kenyatté Hassell is running for his first full term unopposed after succeeding Kirk Hatcher in a special election in 2021.
All the elections were canceled by he is the only candidate for elections, he was reelected for his 2nd term.

Endorsements

District 79 
Second term incumbent Republican Representative Joe Lovvorn has represented the 79th district since 2014. The Libertarian Party nominated Amanda Frison to challenge Lovvorn in the general election.

Endorsements

District 80 
Second term incumbent Republican Representative Chris Blackshear ran unopposed in the 80th district.

Endorsements

District 81 
First term incumbent Republican Representative Ed Oliver ran unopposed in the 81st district.

Endorsements

District 82 
Fifth term incumbent Democratic Representative Pebblin Warren narrowly fended off challenger Terrence Kareem Johnson in the Democratic primary. Warren advanced to face Republican nominee and Saint Lucia native Lennora "Tia" Pierrot in the general election.

Endorsements

District 83 
First term incumbent Democratic Representative Jeremy Gray ran unopposed in the 83rd district.

Endorsements

District 84 
Third term incumbent Democratic Representative Berry Forte ran unopposed in the 84th district.

Endorsements

District 85 
Third term incumbent Democratic Representative Dexter Grimsley ran for reelection against Republican nominee Rick Rehm. Grimsley lost the general election to Rehm.

Endorsements

District 86 
Third term incumbent Republican Representative Paul Lee ran unopposed in the 86th district.

Endorsements

District 87 
First term incumbent Republican Representative Jeff Sorrells was challenged in the Republican primary by former Geneva County EMA director Eric Johnson. Sorrells curb stomped Johnson and cruised to the general election unopposed.

Endorsements

District 88 
First term incumbent Republican Representative Will Dismukes was stunned in the primary by Prattville city councilman Jerry Starnes. The Libertarian Party nominated restaurant owner Justin "Tyler" May to face Starnes in the general election.

Endorsements

District 89 
First term incumbent Republican Representative Wes Allen opted to forgo reelection in order to run for Alabama Secretary of State. The Republican Party nominated Troy city councilman Marcus Paramore to succeed Allen.

Endorsements

District 90 
Second term incumbent Republican Representative Chris Sells ran unopposed in the 90th district.

Endorsements

District 91 
First term incumbent Republican Representative Rhett Marques was challenged by small business owner Les Hogan in the Republican primary, with Marques torching Hogan in the primary. No Libertarians or Democrats filed to run for the seat, leaving Marques unopposed in the general election.

Endorsements

District 92 
First term incumbent Republican Representative Mike Jones stepped down to run for a seat in the Alabama Senate. Farmer Matthew Hammett and certified public accountant Greg White ran in the primary to succeed Jones. Hammett narrowly defeated White in the primary. The Democratic Party nominated Lurleen B. Wallace Community College English professor Steve Hubbard to challenge Hammett in the general election.

Endorsements

District 93 
Eighth term incumbent Republican Representative Steve Clouse ran unopposed in the 93rd district.

Endorsements

District 94 
Fourth term incumbent Republican Representative Joe Faust was thrown out in the Republican primary by Silverhill native Jennifer Fidler. The Libertarian Party nominated family court judge Margaret "Maggie" Helveston to challenge Fidler in the general election.

Endorsements

District 95 
Eleventh term incumbent Republican Representative Steve McMillan opted not to seek reelection and retire. State Farm agent Frances Holk-Jones, civil engineer Michael Ludvigsen Jr. and insurance agent Reginald Pulliam all ran in the primary to succeed McMillan. Holk-Jones cleared the field without needing a runoff. The Democratic Party nominated University of Alabama alumnus Richard Brackner to challenge Holk-Jones in the general election.

Endorsements

District 96 
First term incumbent Republican Representative Matt Simpson was challenged by teacher Danielle Duggar in the Republican primary, narrowly winning his seat back. No Libertarians or Democrats filed to run for the seat, leaving Simpson unopposed in the general election.

Endorsements

District 97 
Third term incumbent Democratic Representative Adline Clarke ran unopposed in the 97th district.

Endorsements

District 98 
Third term incumbent Democratic Representative Napoleon Bracy Jr. ran unopposed in the 98th district.

Endorsements

District 99 
First term incumbent Democratic Representative Sam Jones. was challenged by Levi Wright, Jr. in the Democratic primary. It was almost like the primary didn't happen. Jones went unopposed in the general election.

Endorsements

District 100 
Eleventh term incumbent Republican Representative Victor Gaston opted to forgo reelection in favor of retirement. Optometrist Mark Shirey, Alabama Law Enforcement Agency officer Joe Piggott and teacher Pete Kupfer all ran in the primary to replace Gaston. No candidate gained over half of the votes, so Kupfer and Shirey advanced to a runoff. Shirey managed to win the runoff and went on to face Libertarian nominee Peyton Warren in the general election.

Endorsements

District 101 
Second term incumbent Republican Representative Chris Pringle ran unopposed in the 101st district.

Endorsements

District 102 
First term incumbent Republican Representative Shane Stringer ran unopposed in the 102nd district.

Endorsements

District 103 
First term incumbent Democratic Representative Barbara Drummond ran unopposed in the 103rd district.

Endorsements

District 104 
Third term incumbent Republican Representative Margie Wilcox has represented the 104th District since February 2014. Jon Dearman was nominated by the Libertarian Party and is contesting the district in the general election.

Endorsements

District 105 
First term incumbent Republican Representative Chip Brown has represented the 105th District since 2018. He is running for reelection. Mobile native Mark Lewis was nominated by the Libertarian Party to contest the district in the general election.

Endorsements

See also
2022 United States Senate election in Alabama
2022 United States House of Representatives elections
2022 United States gubernatorial elections
2022 Alabama lieutenant gubernatorial election
2022 United States state legislative elections
2022 Alabama Senate election
2022 Alabama elections

References

2022 Alabama elections
Alabama House of Representatives elections
Alabama House